Al-Maratibah is a sub-district located in the Jabal Habashi District, Taiz Governorate, Yemen. Al-Maratibah had a population of 16,188 according to the 2004 census.

References 

Sub-districts in Jabal Habashi District